Kui language may refer to:
 Kui language (India), a Dravidian language of India
 Kui language (Indonesia), an Alor-Pantar language of Indonesia
 Kuy language, an Austroasiatic language of Thailand

See also
Kui (disambiguation)